The Lamp and the Star is an album by jazz percussionist and drummer Alex Cline released on the ECM label on November 1, 1989.

Reception

The AllMusic review states "Percussionist Alex Cline's first album as a composer demonstrates, right out of the gate, the man's knack for conjuring timeless, elemental music. Minimal ambience opens most tracks, with Cline's love of Asian percussion evident via gongs and Tibetan singing bowls".

Track listing
All compositions by Alex Cline.
 "A Blue Robe in the Distance" - 16:07   
 "Eminence" - 6:26   
 "Emerald Light" - 7:26   
 "Altar Stone" - 13:00   
 "Accepting the Chalice" - 7:05

Personnel
Alex Cline - Percussion, Voice
Nels Cline - Voice
Aina Kemanis - Voice
Jeff Gauthier - Violin, Viola, Voice
Hank Roberts - Cello, Voice
Wayne Peet - Piano, Organ
Eric Von Essen - Bass
Susan Rawcliffe - Didgeridoo

References

Alex Cline albums
1989 albums
ECM Records albums